Matthew John Quatraro (born November 14, 1973) is an American professional baseball former minor league player and minor league manager, and the current manager of the Kansas City Royals of Major League Baseball (MLB). He was previously the bench coach for the Tampa Bay Rays from 2019 to 2022.

Quatraro played college baseball for Old Dominion University from 1993 through 1996, where he was named an All-American. Quatraro played in the minors from 1996 through 2003, without reaching the majors. He began coaching in 2004, and was enshrined in the Old Dominion University Sports Hall of Fame that year. He was the assistant hitting coach for MLB's Cleveland Indians from 2014 through 2017, and served as the Rays' third base coach in 2018.

Playing career
Quatraro attended Bethlehem Central High School in Delmar, New York, graduating in 1992. He then enrolled at Old Dominion University. He played college baseball for the Old Dominion Monarchs baseball team in the Colonial Athletic Association (CAA). As a sophomore in 1994, Quatraro won the CAA Tournament Most Valuable Player Award and was named to the CAA's second-team as a first baseman. In 1994 and 1995, Quatraro played collegiate summer baseball with the Harwich Mariners of the Cape Cod Baseball League. He was named to the CAA's first-team as a catcher in 1995 and 1996, his junior and senior seasons. Quatraro, who hit .400 for his entire career at ODU was also named first team CoSIDA Academic All-American in 1996 As a senior, he was named a second team All-American by the American Baseball Coaches Association and a third team All-American by Collegiate Baseball.

The Tampa Bay Devil Rays selected Quatraro in the eighth round of the 1996 Major League Baseball draft. Though he reached Class AAA, the highest level in Minor League Baseball, Quatraro did not play in the major leagues. The Devil Rays released Quatraro after the 2002 season. He signed with the New York Yankees organization for the 2003 season, but the Yankees released him during spring training. As a player, Quatraro had a career .286 batting average, 23 home runs, and 202 runs batted in in 415 games played in Minor League Baseball, without reaching the majors.

Coaching and managing career
After retiring as a player, Quatraro worked as a manager and catching instructor in the Devil Rays' minor league system. He served as the hitting coach of the Hudson Valley Renegades of the Class A-Short Season New York–Penn League in the 2004 and 2005 seasons, and managed the Renegades in 2006 and 2007. He managed the Columbus Catfish of the Class A South Atlantic League (SAL) in 2008, and the Bowling Green Hot Rods, also in the SAL, in 2009.

Quatraro also served as an assistant coach for the University at Albany Great Danes baseball team from 2004 through 2008.

From 2010 through 2013, Quatraro was the minor league hitting coordinator for the Tampa Bay Rays. The Cleveland Indians hired Quatraro to their major league staff as their assistant hitting coach for the 2014 season. The Rays hired him as their third base coach after the 2017 season. When Charlie Montoyo was hired as manager of the Toronto Blue Jays after the 2018 season, the Rays promoted Quatraro to bench coach. After the 2021 season, he interviewed with the Oakland Athletics and New York Mets for their open managerial positions.

After the 2022 season, the Kansas City Royals hired Quatraro as their manager.

Personal life
In 2004, Quatraro was inducted into the Old Dominion University Sports Hall of Fame. Quatraro graduated from Old Dominion with a History degree.

References

External links

1973 births
Living people
Albany Great Danes baseball coaches
Baseball catchers
Baseball coaches from New York (state)
Baseball players from New York (state)
Butte Copper Kings players
Charleston RiverDogs players
Cleveland Indians coaches
Durham Bulls players
Harwich Mariners players
Major League Baseball bench coaches
Major League Baseball third base coaches
Melbourne Reds players
Minor league baseball coaches
Minor league baseball managers
Old Dominion Monarchs baseball players
Orlando Rays players
People from Bethlehem, New York
St. Petersburg Devil Rays players
Tampa Bay Rays coaches
American expatriate baseball players in Australia